Jay Curtis Stager (born July 29, 1956) is an author, radio co-host, musician, and professor of natural sciences at Paul Smith's College in the Adirondack Mountains of upstate New York, where he holds the Draper-Lussi Endowed Chair in Lake Ecology and Paleoecology. He is also a research associate with the Climate Change Institute at the University of Maine, Orono. His research  in Africa and the Adirondacks has focused on the use of lake sediment cores to reconstruct past climates, evolution, and human impacts on ecosystems over centuries to thousands of years. In addition to investigating environmental histories of lakes in Africa, South America, and the United States, he has studied acid rain recovery in Adirondack lakes, human impacts on Thoreau's Walden Pond, fish evolution in Uganda, megadroughts in the Afro-Asian monsoon region, coral reef ecology in the Bahamas, and exploding lakes in Cameroon.

He received a B.A. in biology and geology from Bowdoin College (1979) and a Ph.D. in zoology and geology from Duke University (1984). In 2013 he was named the Carnegie-CASE Science Professor of the Year for New York state. Since 1990 he has co-hosted Natural Selections a weekly science program on North Country Public Radio. An expert reviewer for the fifth assessment report of the Intergovernmental Panel of Climate Change, he has published several dozen technical papers in Science, PNAS, and other journals, and has written for National Geographic Magazine, The New York Times, and other periodicals for general audiences. He is the author of Field Notes from the Northern Forest (Syracuse University Press, 1997), Deep Future: The Next 100,000 Years of Life On Earth (St. Martin's Press, 2011), which was a Kirkus Best Nonfiction Book of 2011, Your Atomic Self (St. Martin's Press, 2014), a Commended Book for the AAAS/Subaru Prize for Excellence in Science Books, and Still Waters: The Secret World of Lakes (W.W. Norton, 2018). His science-outreach efforts have also included a graphic novel about his student-centered research on Walden Pond, numerous public presentations on climate change and lake ecology, and a convention of Catholic Climate Ambassadors at Paul Smith's College in March, 2016.

A YouTube video of Curt playing guitar for a pet crow that appeared online in 2015 has been popular on various websites. He performs frequently on banjo and guitar, was director of Meadowlark Music Camp in Washington, ME, between 1997 and 2010, and has co-organized the annual Science Art Music Festival  at Paul Smith’s College since 2014.

Selected publications 
 Silent Death From Cameroon's Killer Lake. National Geographic (September, 1987).
 Stager, J.C., D.R. Ryves, B.M. Chase, and F.S.R. Pausata. Catastrophic drought in the Afro-Asian monsoon regions during Heinrich Event 1. Science 331: 1299-1302. (2011)
 Deep Future: The Next 100,000 Years of Life on Earth (Saint Martin’s Press; 2011).
 Stager, J.C. and M. Thill. Climate Change in the Adirondacks: What Natural Resource Managers Can Expect and Do. (2010).
 Your Atomic Self: The Invisible Elements That Connect You to Everything Else in the Universe (Saint Martin’s Press; 2014).
 Stager, J.C., L.A. Sporn, M. Johnson, and S. Regalado. Of paleo-genes and perch: What if an "alien" is actually a native? PLOS ONE, doi:10.1371/journal.pone.0119071. (2015)
Tales of a Warmer Planet. New York Times (November 28, 2015).
 What The Muck of Walden Pond Tells Us About Our Planet. New York Times (January 7, 2017).
 Hidden Heritage. Adirondack Life (June, 2017).
 Still Waters: The Secret World of Lakes (W.W. Norton; in press).

Videos 

 "Deep Future." TEDx Perth, Australia, July 13, 2011.
 "Blackbird."
 "Climate Whiplash." Paul Smith's College presentation.
 "Hidden Heritage." Native Americans and environmental history in the Adirondacks.

References

External links 
Natural Selections radio program
TEDx talk in Perth, Australia
Welcome to the Age of Humans video interview
New York Times "Tales of a Warmer Planet"

1956 births
Living people
Paul Smith's College faculty